The Sager Strong Award is an annual award given by the National Basketball Association. It is presented to "an individual who has been a trailblazer while exemplifying courage, faith, compassion, and grace." The award was created in 2017 to honor the longtime NBA sideline reporter Craig Sager (1951-2016), and the recipient receives a replica of the colorful sports coat that Sager wore when accepting the 2016 Jimmy V Award.

Recipients

References

National Basketball Association awards